Sardocyrnia is a genus of moths in the family Geometridae. The genus was described by Wehrli in 1943.

Species
Sardocyrnia bastelicaria (Bellier, 1862) Spain
Sardocyrnia fortunaria Vázquez-G, 1905 Sardinia

References

Geometridae